Reuben Theodore Meade (born 7 March 1954) is a retired politician from Montserrat who served as the island's first Premier between 2010 and 2014.  He previously served as Chief Minister between 1991 and 1996 and 2009 to 2010. A member of the Movement for Change and Prosperity (MCAP), he previously led the now-defunct National Progressive Party.

Biography
He launched his election campaign (for the early general election of 8 September 2009) on 28 July 2009. His party won the majority, garnering six of the nine seats up for grabs, while former chief minister Dr Lowell Lewis and two other independents took the remaining seats. 
Meade was congratulated by his political opponent, Lewis, and said that the revival of the economy of Montserrat would be his main priority.

The 2014 elections saw the defeat of the MCAP. Meade finished seventh in the vote total, retaining his seat in the Legislative Assembly.

References

1954 births
Chief Ministers of Montserrat
Living people
Movement for Change and Prosperity politicians
National Progressive Party (Montserrat) politicians
University of the West Indies alumni
Premiers of Montserrat